Bagel toast is a sandwich commonly eaten in Israel. It is composed of a pressed, toasted bagel filled with vegetables and cheese and is grilled on a sandwich toaster or panini press. While the bagel is round with a hole in the center, it is unlike the typical American bagel in that it is made from a different dough with sesame seeds. Bagel toast is generally filled with tzfatit, feta, white or yellow cheese, green olives, corn, tomatoes, onions, dressing, and pizza or chili sauce.

Bagel toast is typically found in cafes or coffee houses in Israel and is also served as a casual snack in the home. At the famous Abulafia Bakery, in Jaffa, Tel Aviv, Israel, bagel toast is served with a side of za'atar, a mixture of sumac, sesame seeds and herbs.

See also
 Bagel and cream cheese
 List of sandwiches
 List of toast dishes
 Ka'ak

References

External links

Bagels
Israeli cuisine
Jewish breads
Cheese sandwiches
Toast dishes